Philip Menzie Duncan II (born December 6, 1944) is an American prelate who served as the third Episcopalian Bishop of the Central Gulf Coast from 2001 until 2015.

Biography
Duncan was born on December 6, 1944 in Glen Cove, New York, the son of Scottish parents Philip and Jesse Duncan. He studied at Baldwin Wallace University, from where he graduated with a Bachelor of Arts, and the General Theological Seminary from where he earned his Master of Divinity. He also received a Doctor of Ministry from Virginia Theological Seminary and a Doctor of Divinity from General Theological, the University of the South and the Virginia Seminary, respectively. In 1970 he married Kathlyn Anne Cowie and together had two sons.

Duncan was ordained in 1970 and became associate rector of Christ Church in Ridgewood, New Jersey. In 1972 he became rector of St John's Church in Clearwater, Florida, while in 1992 he moved to Dallas, Texas to become Dean of St Matthew's Cathedral. He was elected Bishop of the Central Gulf Coast in 2001 and was consecrated on May 12, 2001 by Presiding Bishop Frank Griswold. He retained the post till his retirement in 2015.

References

1944 births
Living people
Episcopal bishops of the Central Gulf Coast
People from Glen Cove, New York
American people of Scottish descent
Baldwin Wallace University alumni
Virginia Theological Seminary alumni